Estadio Municipal de Pasarón is an all-seater football stadium located in Pontevedra, Galicia, Spain.

History 
Precedents
The old stadium of Pasarón was inaugurated in 1965, just some months before the Pontevedra CF's debut in Primera División.
New stadium
Following the promotion to Segunda of Pontevedra CF in the 2003–04 season, plans for a new municipal stadium were brought forward, although building works did not begin until 2006. Pontevedra began to play in the new stadium in 2010. On 7 September 2012, the stadium held a friendly fixture between Spain and Saudi Arabia (5–0).

Ownership and features 
The stadium is owned and operated by the City Council of Pontevedra and has a capacity of 12,000.

References

Related articles 
 O Burgo

External links

Estadios de España 
Estadio Pasaron, Pontevedra 

Buildings and structures in Pontevedra
Pontevedra CF
Football venues in Galicia (Spain)
Sports venues completed in 1965